Roque Funes (1 December 1897 – 15 June 1981 in  Buenos Aires) was the most prolific Argentine cinematographer in the history of the Cinema of Argentina whose career spanned over 40 years of cinema.

He began working in cinematography in 1921 with director José A. Ferreyra in La Gaucha, and worked extensively with Ferreyra on films that followed such as Buenos Aires, ciudad de ensueño (1922), La Leyenda del puente inca (1923) and Odio serrano (1924).

In 1939 he worked on Bodas de sangre and Amor. Funes worked on Capitán Veneno in 1943 and Albergue de mujeres in 1946.

The successful Con la música en el alma was released in 1951 and he worked on the Bárbara atómica film in 1952. His last film was Venus perseguida before his retirement as a cinematographer in 1964.

He died on 15 June 1981 in Buenos Aires aged 83.

Filmography
Venus perseguida (1964)
Marido de Mulher Boa (1960)
Del cuplé al tango (1958)
Violencia en la ciudad (1957)
Sonámbulo que quería dormir, El (1956)
Escuela de sirenas y tiburones (1955)
Mi marido hoy duerme en casa (1955)
Misión extravagante (1954) ...  Misión en Buenos Aires (Argentina)
Siete gritos en el mar (1954)
Somos todos inquilinos (1954)
Tres mosquiteros, Los (1953) ... a.k.a. The Three Mosquiteers (International: English title)
¡Qué noche de casamiento! (1953)
Romeo y Julita (1953)
Suegra último modelo (1953)
Bárbara atómica (1952)
Infortunado Fortunato, El (1952)
¡Qué rico el mambo! (1952)
Mucamo de la niña, El (1951)
Tierra extraña (1951)
 The Path to Crime (1951)
Con la música en el alma (1951)
Morocho del Abasto: La vida de Carlos Gardel, El (1950)
Doctora Castañuelas, La (1950)
Hombre de las sorpresas, El (1949)
To do un héroe (1949)
Fúlmine (1949)
Imitaciones peligrosas (1949)
Nieto de Congreve, El (1949)
Otra cosa es con guitarra (1949)
Pantalones cortos (1949)
 Modern Husbands (1948))
Cuidado con las imitaciones (1948)
María de los Ángeles (1948)
Jugador, El (1948)
Romance sin palabras (1948)
 Lucrezia Borgia (1947)
Marido ideal, Un (1947)
Misterioso tío Sylas, El (1947) a.k.a. The Mysterious Uncle Silas
Albergue de mujeres (1946)
3 millones y el amor (1946)
Capitán Pérez, El (1946)
Modelo de París, Un (1946)
La Amada inmóvil (1945)
 A Woman of No Importance (1945)
Danza de la fortuna, La (1944) .. a.k.a. The Dance of Fortune (International: English title)
Dos rivales, Los (1944) ... a.k.a. The Two Rivals (International: English title)
Deseo, El (1944)
Sorpresas del divorcio, Las (1943)
Piel de Zapa, La (1943)
 Captain Poison (1943)
Pasión impossible (1943)
Sillón y la gran duquesa, El (1943)
Suerte llama tres veces, La (1943)
Malambo (1942)
Bruma en el Riachuelo (1942)
 The House of the Millions (1942)
Mañana me suicido (1942)
 Sensational Kidnapping (1942)
Su primer baile (1942)
 Story of a Poor Young Man (1942)
Peluquería de señoras (1941)
Cándida millonaria (1941)
 When the Heart Sings (1941)
Joven, viuda y estanciera (1941)
Si yo fuera rica (1941)
Maestrita de los obreros, La (1941)
 Mother Gloria (1941)
Más infeliz del pueblo, El (1941)
Papá tiene novia (1941)
Mi fortuna por un nieto (1940)
Celos de Cándida, Los (1940)
The Tango Star (1940)
Amor (1940 film)
De México llegó el amor (1940)
Pueblo chico, infierno grande (1940)
Señor mucamo, Un (1940)
 Our Land of Peace (1939)
Bodas de sangre (1938)
Barranca abajo (1937)
Murió el sargento Laprida (1937)
Mañana es domingo (1934)
 Streets of Buenos Aires (1934)
En el infierno del Chaco (1932)
Mi último tango (1925)
Arriero de Yacanto, El (1924)
Mientras Buenos Aires duerme (1924)
Odio serrano (1924)
La Leyenda del puente inca (1923)
El Puñal del mazorquero (1923)
Buenos Aires, ciudad de ensueño (1922)
La Gaucha (1921)

External links
 

1897 births
1981 deaths
Argentine cinematographers
People from Buenos Aires